Liptena intermedia is a butterfly in the family Lycaenidae. It is found in southern Cameroon and Equatorial Guinea.

References

Butterflies described in 1910
Liptena